Marolles-les-Braults is a commune in the Sarthe department in the region of Pays de la Loire in north-western France. On 1 January 2019, the former commune Dissé-sous-Ballon was merged into Marolles-les-Braults.

See also
Communes of the Sarthe department

References

Communes of Sarthe
Sarthe communes articles needing translation from French Wikipedia